The Flüüger Quer Dübendorf is a cyclo-cross race held in Dübendorf, Switzerland.

Past winners

References
 results

Cycle races in Switzerland
Cyclo-cross races
Recurring sporting events established in 2007
2007 establishments in Switzerland
Dübendorf